Seneweb.com is a web portal with content mainly geared to the Senegalese community in both Senegal and around the world.

History 
Seneweb was founded in 1999 by Abdoulaye Salam Madior Fall. In 2000 Daouda Mbaye became the Co-owner of Seneweb.

Within a few months, the site knows resounding success especially among the Senegalese diaspora. The number of Internet-connected in Senegal did not exceed 40,000 in 2000. It was one of the few web sites to cover the presidential election campaign. As well as news, it hosts streaming video and audio and political forums.

A few years after its inception, the portal has become the most visited and popular in Francophone West Africa. Every day there are hundreds of thousands of Internet users who log on Seneweb, which is unquestionably the Senegalese Web giant.
Today Seneweb is ranked first among Senegalese sites only content.

Seneweb is also classified as the 2,176th site of the most visited websites on the internet from 234 million worldwide, according to Alexa. Seneweb receives on average per month more than 4,000,000 (four million) of visitors and over thirty million page views per month.
The majority of visitors come respectively from Senegal, France, the United States and other African countries. 
In July 2015 Seneweb launches mobile application available on Appstore and Playstore.

See also 
 Media of Senegal

References

Science and technology in Senegal
Mass media in Senegal
Web portals